Capo Carbonara Lighthouse is a light situated at the extremity of the granite promontory of Capo Carbonara, in the comune of Villasimius, on the eastern side of Gulf of Cagliari inside the Marine protected area of Capo Carbonara.

Description
The place, for its position, hosted several defensive towers as Fortezza Vecchia built by the Aragonesi, the tower of Porto Giunco built in 1580 and the small tower light of Capo Carbonara built in 1578.

The first lighthouse was built in 1917 and was described as a skeletal tower; the current was built in 1974 and is placed on the top of the Cape at 120 metres.

See also
 List of lighthouses in Italy

References

External links

 Servizio Fari Marina Militare 

Lighthouses in Italy
Lighthouses completed in 1974
Buildings and structures in Sardinia